Finlay Park, at , is the largest and most visited park in downtown Columbia, South Carolina. The park opened in 1991. Initially named Sidney Park, it was renamed after a former Columbia mayor Kirkman Finlay in 1994. In the park there was a scenic waterfall along with cascading mountain type stream falling to the park lake. This waterfall has remained broken for the better half of two years. There are picnic tables, two playground areas and a cafe. The park was a favorite for families, but is now home to the city's largest population of homeless people. Problems with the park have persisted and prompted local charity organizations to begin weekly food services to the people living on the park's benches. Outdoor movies are played on Friday nights during the summer months.

The park is also host to numerous events and festivals, including the Sizzlin' Summer Concert Series. The free outdoor concerts (7 – 10 p.m.) run for 13 weeks beginning May 24 and include blues, beach, classical, contemporary/top 40, country, bluegrass, reggae and more. Admission is free and picnics are welcomed (glass containers, grills, pets and radios are not permitted).

Events
In the fall of 2000, WARQ (then an alternative station) hosted its third annual Fallout concert at Finlay Park. The lineup in 2000 was Everclear, Tennessee's Fuel, Eve 6, Baltimore's SR-71, and rap rock group 2 Skinnee J's. In 2001, WARQ hosted Fallout again with California's Incubus and Virginia's Seven Mary Three. In 2002, Fallout had Canada's Our Lady Peace and Jimmy Eat World. In 2003, the final Fallout concert had Canada's Three Days Grace, Canada's Default, and Smile Empty Soul. On April 22, 1996, Finlay Park had a free concert by Columbia's Hootie & the Blowfish (who were at the peak of their fame and promoting Fairweather Johnson, which was released the next day and went to #1). In spring 2012, the park hosted Spartanburg's Marshall Tucker Band. In fall '09, it hosted Holypalooza with Christian rock bands Tampa's The Almost and Hartsville's Sent by Ravens. In fall 2007, it hosted Texas' hard rock band Flyleaf (with a female lead singer). In 1997 it hosted Eddie Money, and in 1995 it hosted Jacksonville's Southern rock band 38 Special. In August 2012, Finlay Park was the setting for the 3-day Famously Hot Music Festival, which for the rock bands had Atlanta's Collective Soul, California's Buckcherry, Cleveland's Filter, Eve 6 again, and Seven Mary Three again. Concerts with famous bands were held in Finlay Park for 17 years.

References

External links
Columbia City Parks
Columbia4Kids: Finlay Park
Map: 

Parks in South Carolina
Geography of Columbia, South Carolina
Protected areas of Richland County, South Carolina
Tourist attractions in Columbia, South Carolina